The year 1995 in architecture involved some significant architectural events and new buildings.

Events
 19 April – Oklahoma City bombing: The blast destroys or damages 324 buildings within a 16-block radius.
 6 November – Rova of Antananarivo in Madagascar largely destroyed by fire.
 date unknown
 Zaha Hadid wins the competition to design the Cardiff Bay Opera House in Wales. Funding is rejected in December and the project abandoned.
 Steven Holl Architects begin construction work at St. Ignatius Chapel, Seattle University, USA.

Buildings and structures

Buildings completed
 January – New San Francisco Museum of Modern Art, designed by Mario Botta.
 1 March – Kuala Lumpur Tower, Malaysia.
 11 April – Évry Cathedral, designed by Mario Botta.
 20 August – BAPS Shri Swaminarayan Mandir London Hindu temple in Neasden, designed by C. B. Sompura.
 August – Cambridge Judge Business School (England) designed by John Outram.
 28 November – Barcelona Museum of Contemporary Art, designed by Richard Meier.
 Bonnefantenmuseum in Maastricht, Netherlands, designed by Aldo Rossi.
 Benedictine monastery, Tomelilla, Sweden, designed by Dom Hans van der Laan (d.1991).
 Ojo del Sol in Berkeley, California, designed by Eugene Tsui as a home for his parents.

Awards
 AIA Gold Medal – César Pelli.
 Architecture Firm Award – Beyer Blinder Belle.
 Carlsberg Architectural Prize – Juha Leiviskä
 Praemium Imperiale Architecture Laureate – Renzo Piano.
 Pritzker Architecture Prize – Tadao Ando.
 Prix de l'Équerre d'Argent – Christian de Portzamparc for the Cité de la Musique in Paris.
 RIBA Royal Gold Medal – Colin Rowe.
 Thomas Jefferson Medal in Architecture – Ian McHarg.
 Twenty-five Year Award – The Ford Foundation Headquarters

Deaths
 31 March – Max Brüel, Danish architect and jazz musician (born 1927)
 20 September – Eulie Chowdhury, Indian architect (born 1923)

References

 
20th-century architecture